Victorian Adventure is a Victorian-era role-playing game published by SKS Distribution (U.K.) in 1983.

Description
Victorian Adventure is a historical mystery/adventure system set in 19th-century England, during the height of the British Empire. The main object of the game is to better yourself and make money. The character and skill rules are simple, with the background and social systems covering such things as social class and status, spiritualism, history, background, prominent events, prices, clothes, and inventions of the period. The game includes three scenarios. 

The second edition greatly expands the rules and adds two new scenarios.

Publication history
Victorian Adventure was designed by Stephen Smith, and published by SKS Distribution in 1983 as a 50-page book. The second edition was published in 1985 as a boxed set containing a greatly expanded rulebook, a map, and cardstock miniatures.

Reception
In the June 1984 edition of Imagine (Issue 15), Chris Hunter was not impressed by the game, saying, "the poor artwork and the occasional low standard of English do not help a set of rules which in their present state I would not recommend."

In the January 1990 edition  of Games International (Issue 12), Kevin Jacklin was disappointed by this game, saying, "it does little to further the 'art of detection' in the Victorian (or indeed any other) era." Although Jacklin found the three scenarios of varying quality, he concluded, "The real problems with the game are the virtually incomprehensible character generation rules and game mechanics."

In the 1991 book Heroic Worlds: A History and Guide to Role-Playing Games, Lawrence Schick felt that "the main strength of the game is its strong background and social systems".

Other reviews
Fantasy Gamer #6 (June/July, 1984)

References

British role-playing games
Historical role-playing games
Role-playing games introduced in 1983